The 2020 cycling season for Trek–Segafredo began in January at the Tour Down Under in Australia.

Among Trek–Segafredo's ranks this season are multiple Grand Tour winner Vincenzo Nibali of Italy and two defending world champions in world road race champion Mads Pedersen of Denmark and junior road race champion Quinn Simmons of the United States.

Roster

Riders who joined the team for the 2020 season

Riders who left the team during or after the 2019 season

Season victories

National, Continental and World Champions

Footnotes

References

External links
 
 

Trek–Segafredo (men's team)
Trek-Segafredo
Trek-Segafredo season